Bočiar is a village and municipality in Košice-okolie District in the Košice Region of eastern Slovakia.

History
In historical records the village was first mentioned in 1249.

Geography
The village lies at an altitude of 210 metres and covers an area of 4.721 km². It has a population of about 220 people.

Genealogical resources

The records for genealogical research are available at the state archive "Statny Archiv in Kosice, Slovakia"

 Roman Catholic church records (births/marriages/deaths): 1714-1952 (parish B)
 Greek Catholic church records (births/marriages/deaths): 1791-1896 (parish B)
 Lutheran church records (births/marriages/deaths): 1714-1952 (parish B)

See also
 List of municipalities and towns in Slovakia

External links

Surnames of living people in Bociar

Villages and municipalities in Košice-okolie District